Karen Alexander (born circa 1965 in New Jersey) is an American fashion model and actress, most known for her modeling career. She is 5'10" with dark brown hair and eyes. She began her career when she was sixteen years old, visiting multiple modeling agencies in New York. She tried to sign with Eileen Ford, John Casablancas, and Bethann Hardison, but was seen as "unphotogenic," not "commercial" enough, or too "commercial" by each of them respectively. It wasn't until she came across Legends Agency that she was finally signed and could begin her career. Alexander would go on to become a muse to fashion's top designers and magazine editors, and create a name for herself for at least two decades. Legends Agency is now non-existent and Alexander was represented by IMG until 2019 she was diagnosed with Dermatomyositis an incurable neuromuscular disease.

Career

Alexander is most known for her modeling during the late eighties and early nineties. During her career, she was featured on the covers of Vogue, Harpers Bazaar, Elle, Mademoiselle, Glamour, and Mirabella and worked on campaigns for Cover Girl, Tiffany & Co, and Chanel's Allure. She also worked with the top photographers of her time such as Steven Meisel, Patrick Demarchelier, Gilles Bensimon, and Peter Lindbergh. Alexander reached the peak of her career when she was featured in the 1988 and 1989 Sports Illustrated Swimsuit Issues and in Herb Ritts' Pirelli Calendar. She was then featured in People magazine's "50 Most Beautiful People, proving how successful she truly had become. Despite being so successful, she told People that she had never felt she was pretty until she was pregnant. In the 1990 interview, she told them, Until I was pregnant I felt like an impostor waiting to be found out."

Although she is known to have broken barriers for models of color, being one of the first to be featured in a Sports Illustrated swimsuit edition, she has been the victim of racism throughout her career. She told Vogue during an interview in 1991, "I really don't have the same modeling options of, say, Cindy Crawford or Christy Turlington - although I don't mean to single them out. My agency will say, 'Oh, they aren't using a black girl.'"

As for her film career, Alexander is most known for her appearance in the 1995 film Bad Boys.

Personal life

Alexander is married to an American screenwriter and has three daughters. Alexander is a member of a group that works to end gun violence.

References

External links

See Karen Alexander at: Fashion Model Directory, Internet Movie Database, models.com

1966 births
Female models from New Jersey
Living people
People from New Jersey
21st-century American women
African-American female models
African-American models